Paris Cullins is an American comics artist best known for his work on DC Comics' Blue Devil and Blue Beetle and Marvel Comics' Hyperkind.

Career

Early career
Cullins had sent DC Comics samples of his  comic art since 1976, finally meeting with Dick Giordano in the last week of 1979. Cullins recalled in 2007 that, 

Cullins' first known credited comics work was as penciler-inker of the six-page story "Mystic Murder", by writer Steve Skeates, in the DC Comics supernatural anthology Secrets of Haunted House #42 (Nov. 1981). He drew four "I ... Vampire" stories in the House of Mystery series and pencilled stories in such similar DC titles as Ghosts, The Unexpected, and Weird War Tales through the early 1980s, and made his superhero debut penciling an eight-page "Tales of the Green Lantern Corps" backup feature in Green Lantern #154 (July 1982). As well, artist Ernie Colón, whom Cullins met at DC and who drew Richie Rich and other children's titles for Harvey Comics, "offered me a job doing some extra work for Harvey Comics. For several months I drew Richie Rich and Hot Stuff.

"Blue" period

After co-penciling Justice League of America #212 (March 1983) with Rich Buckler, and making his cover debut with The Daring New Adventures of Supergirl #7, Cullins penciled his first full-length comic, Blue Devil #1 (June 1984), starring a superhero he had co-created with writers Gary Cohn and Dan Mishkin earlier that month for a backup feature in The Fury of Firestorm #24 (June 1984).

Blue Devil ran 31 issues, through cover–date December 1986, with Cullins penciling the first six and Blue Devil Annual #1 (1985), and covers through the end of the run. Cullins additionally drew dozens of DC covers and occasional stories through the decade, and numerous character pages for Who's Who: The Definitive Directory of the DC Universe. Cullins and writer Len Wein produced a Ted Kord Blue Beetle series for DC, which had acquired the character from the defunct Charlton Comics. Cullins penciled issues #1–9, 11–14, and 17–18 (collectively, June 1986–Nov. 1987). He was one of the artists on Batman #400 (Oct. 1986).

Cullins began working for Marvel Comics by penciling three six–page High Evolutionary backup stories, one each in the 1988 X-Factor Annual #3, The Punisher Annual #1, and Silver Surfer Annual #1. He was still freelancing primarily for DC, collaborating there with writer J. M. DeMatteis on a six-issue miniseries revival (Feb.–July 1988) of Jack Kirby's The Forever People, penciling the stories and covers. With writer Mark Evanier, primarily, Cullins co-plotted and penciled issues #1–9, 11–12, and 15–18 (collectively, Feb. 1989–July 1990) of a revival of Kirby's The New Gods.

Later career

In the 1990s, Cullins, while keeping DC as his home base, branched out to draw additional occasional comics for Marvel, and for publishers including Acclaim Comics, Massive Comics Group, Penthouse International (Penthouse Comix), and Crusade Comics. Teamed with writer Fred Burke, Cullins penciled stories and covers for all nine issues of the superhero-team comic Hyperkind, for Marvel's Clive Barker–created Razorline imprint.

He was largely absent from comics from 1996, when he did pencil breakdowns for DC's Life, the Universe and Everything #1, to 2001, when he penciled the cover of DC/OnStar's Onstar Batman Special Edition #1. Cullins contributed a one-page Blazin' Glory pinup to Atomeka Press' A1 Sketchbook (Nov. 2004), his last known comics work as of 2007.

At some point, Cullins did book-cover art and "worked for advertisement agencies, and did storyboards for video games and TV commercials, Activision in particular, and full-color storyboards and designs for a game called Terror in the Bermuda Triangle".

In December 2006, the Philadelphia, Pennsylvania-based Maximum Overtime Media announced the first-quarter 2007 planned premiere of Gritz n' Gravy, "a quarterly illustrated adult urban fantasy and popular-culture national magazine", with Cullins, a company co-founder, announced as publisher.

In May 2011, DC Comics announced he would be the artist, paired with writer William Messner-Loebs, on Wonder Woman - The '90s, a one-shot in DC's nostalgic DC Retroactive series. However, the book would be drawn by Lee Moder and Dan Green rather than Cullins.

Bibliography

Atomeka Press
 A1 #1 (1989)

Crusade Comics
 Shi: Senryaku #1 (1995)
 Shi: The Way of the Warrior #10 (1996)

DC Comics

 Action Comics #576, 580 (1986)
 Animal Man #22 (1990)
 Batman #400 (1986)
 Blue Beetle #1–9, 11–14, 17–18 (1986–1987)
 Blue Devil #1–6, Annual #1 (1984–1985)
 Captain Atom Annual #2 (1988)
 Checkmate #14 (1989)
 Detective Comics #527–529 (Green Arrow backup stories) (1983)
 Doom Force Special #1 (1992)
 Forever People vol. 2 #1–6 (1988)
 The Fury of Firestorm #24 (Blue Devil insert preview) (1984)
 Ghosts #110 (1982)
 Green Arrow vol. 2 #8 (1988)
 Green Lantern vol. 2 #154, 156, Annual #3 (1982–1987)
 Hawk and Dove vol. 3 #10, Annual #2 (1990–1991)
 Heroes Against Hunger #1 (1986)
 House of Mystery #311, 315–317 ("I...Vampire" feature) (1982–1983)
 Justice League America #50 (1991)
 Justice League of America #212 (1983)
 Legion of Super-Heroes vol. 3 #21 (1986)
 Legion of Super-Heroes vol. 4 #9 (1990)
 Life, the Universe and Everything #1 (1996)
 New Gods vol. 3 #1–15, 17–18 (1989–1990)
 The New Teen Titans Annual vol. 2 #4 (1988)
 The New Titans #79–80, Annual #6 (1990–1991)
 Omega Men #27 (1985)
 Scooby-Doo #94, 99 (2005)
 Secret Origins vol. 2 #41, 48 (1989–1990)
 Secrets of Haunted House #42 (1981)
 Superboy vol. 3 #13 (1991)
 Superman vol. 2 #31 (1989)
 The Unexpected #220 (1982)
 Valor #9 (1993)
 Vigilante #15 (1985)
 The Warlord #102 (1986)
 Weird War Tales #113, 121 (1982–1983)
 Who's Who in the DC Universe #1–3, 9–10, 12 (1990–1991)
 Who's Who in the Legion of Super-Heroes #4 (1988)
 Who's Who: The Definitive Directory of the DC Universe #3, 5–6, 8, 11–12, 16, 24 (1985–1987)
 Who's Who: Update '87 #1 (1987)
 Wonder Woman vol. 2 #65–71 (1992–1993)

DC Comics/United States Postal Service
 Celebrate the Century [Super Heroes Stamp Album] #10 (2000)

Marvel Comics

 The Amazing Spider-Man Annual #25 (1991)
 Cage #14 (1993)
 Clive Barker's Hellraiser #7, 11 (1991–1992)
 Hyperkind #1–7, 9 (1993–1994)
 The Punisher Annual #1 (1988)
 Saint Sinner #1 (1993)
 Silver Surfer Annual #1 (1988)
 Web of Spider-Man Annual #7 (1991)
 What If...? vol. 2 #51 (1993)
 X-Factor Annual #3 (1988)

Massive Comics Group
 Tales from the Aniverse #2 (1991)

Penthouse
 Omni Comix #3 (1995)
 Penthouse Comix #2 (1994)

Valiant Comics
 Magnus, Robot Fighter #0, 6, 49 (1991–1995)

References

External links
  Archived from the original on July 5, 2014.
 Paris Cullins at Mike's Amazing World of Comics
 

Living people
20th-century American artists
21st-century American artists
Advertising artists and illustrators
African-American comics creators
American comics artists
American comics creators
American storyboard artists
Artists from Philadelphia
DC Comics people
Marvel Comics people
Role-playing game artists
Year of birth missing (living people)